Jesse Shanahan is an American disability activist and AI researcher born in 1991. She co-founded the American Astronomical Society's Working Group on Accessibility and Disability.

Education and research 
Shanahan was an Echols Scholar at the University of Virginia, where she studied Arabic linguistics and philosophy.

Later in her undergraduate education, she switched to astrophysics and decided to pursue graduate school. She spent two years at Wesleyan University before leaving the program due to her health and ongoing harassment. She conducted research in astrophysics, working with Brooke Simmons at the University of California, San Diego and Chris Lintott of Zooniverse. Her main research focused on the spectroscopic signatures of active galactic nuclei and their host galaxies. Between 2018 and 2021 she worked as a data scientist at Booz Allen Hamilton, specializing in humanitarian applications of artificial intelligence and ethics, and since July 2021 she works as a Machine Learning Developer at Peltarion, where she conducts research on AI ethics and bias in natural language processing.

Disability 
Shanahan has Ehlers-Danlos syndrome, a genetic connective tissue disease that causes pain and impacts her ability to move.

She was interviewed by the Science History Institute as part of their oral history project related to disabled scientists.

Writing 
Shanahan contributes to Forbes, writing about linguistics and astrophysics, and on her personal Medium page. Her social media posts are sometimes included in articles about disability or ableism. Shanahan created the hashtag "#DisabledAndSTEM" which is used to discuss experiences with disability in science.

References 

Scientists with disabilities
21st-century American women scientists
American astrophysicists
American disability rights activists
Living people
People with Ehlers–Danlos syndrome
Women astrophysicists
Artificial intelligence ethicists
Women data scientists
University of Virginia alumni
Wesleyan University alumni
1991 births